is a subway station in the Nagatacho district of Chiyoda, Tokyo, Japan, operated by the Tokyo subway operator Tokyo Metro.

Lines 
Nagatachō Station is served by the following three lines.
   (N-07)
   (Y-16)
   (Z-04)

It is also connected by an underground passageway from the western end of the  Hanzōmon Line platform to Akasaka-mitsuke Station on the Ginza and Marunouchi lines.

Station layout
The station consists of three island platforms, each serving two tracks.
 B1F level: Ticket vending areas
 B3F level: Namboku Line platforms
 B4F level: Yūrakuchō Line platforms
 B6F level: Hanzōmon Line platforms

Platforms

Passengers
In fiscal 2019, this station had 91,240 passengers daily.

History
The Namboku Line platforms opened on September 30, 1997.

The station facilities were inherited by Tokyo Metro after the privatization of the Teito Rapid Transit Authority (TRTA) in 2004.

Surrounding area
 Diet of Japan
 National Diet Library
 Supreme Court of Japan
 Headquarters of the Liberal Democratic Party (Japan)
 Akasaka Excel Hotel Tokyu
 Akasaka Prince Hotel
 Tokyo Garden Terrace
 Hotel New Otani
 Hibiya High School
 Japan Center for Asian Historical Records

References

External links

 Nagatachō Station information 

Railway stations in Tokyo
Tokyo Metro Namboku Line
Tokyo Metro Hanzomon Line
Tokyo Metro Yurakucho Line
Railway stations in Japan opened in 1974